Puxian (Hinghwa Romanized: Pó-sing-gṳ̂), also known as Pu-Xian Chinese, Puxian Min, Xinghua, Henghwa or Hinghwa (Hing-hua̍-gṳ̂), is a Sinitic language that forms a branch of Min Chinese. Puxian is a transitional variety of Coastal Min which shares characteristics with both Eastern Min and Southern Min, although it is closer to the latter.

The native language of Putian people, Puxian is spoken mostly in Fujian province, particularly in Putian city and Xianyou County (after which it is named), parts of Fuzhou, and parts of Quanzhou.  It is also widely used as the mother tongue in Wuqiu Township, Kinmen County, Fujian Province, Republic of China (Taiwan). More than 2,000 people in Shacheng, Fuding in northern Fujian also speak Puxian. There are minor differences between the dialects of Putian and Xianyou.

Overseas populations of Puxian speakers exist in Malaysia, Indonesia and Singapore. Speakers of Puxian are also known as Henghua, Hinghua, or Xinghua.

History
Before the year 979 AD, the Puxian region was part of Quanzhou county and people there spoke a form of Southern Min. due to its origin in the past.

In 979 AD, during the Song Dynasty, the region was administratively separated from Quanzhou and the Chinese spoken there developed separately from the rest of Southern Min. Due to its proximity with Fuzhou, it absorbed some elements of Eastern Min, such as morphophonemic alternations in initial consonants, but its basic linguistic characteristics, i.e. grammar and most of its lexicon, are based on Southern Min. It also shares denasalization of historical nasal consonants and vocalic nasalization with Southern Min varieties.

Puxian Min has 62% cognates with Quanzhou dialect (Southern Min) and only 39% cognates with Fuzhou dialect (Eastern Min).

Characteristics

Differences with Southern Min dialects
Puxian differs from most Southern Min varieties in several ways:

 In Putian 'ng' has changed to  except after zero initial and h- (notation: ng), e.g. 湯 tung "soup".
 The vowel /e/ is often replaced by /ɒ/ o̤, e.g. 馬 bo̤ "horse".
 Where Quanzhou has 'ĩ' and Zhangzhou has 'ẽ', the corresponding Putian vowel is 'ã', e.g. 病 baⁿ "sick", where ⁿ indicates a nasalized vowel.
 The vowel 'io' is replaced by 'iau' (notation: a̤u), e.g. 笑 ciao "laugh". This also holds for nasalized vowels, e.g. 張 da̤uⁿ corresponding to Zhangzhou tioⁿ.
 Nasals 'm' sometimes occur in place of voiced stops 'b', e.g. 夢 mang vs. Quanzhou bang.
 Initial consonant 'ng' replaces 'g' e.g. 五 'ngo' vs. Quanzhou 'go'.
 There is a loss of distinction between voiced and unvoiced stops, e.g. the sounds /b/ and /p/ both correspond to the same phoneme and occur in free variation.

Borrowings from Eastern Min 

 Wife 老媽 (Lau Ma)

Phonology

Puxian has 15 consonants, including the zero onset, the same as most other Min varieties.

Puxian has 53 finals and 6 phonemic tones.

Initials

 (only appears in connected speech. It's a result of consonant mutation of [p])

Finals
Puxian Min has 53 finals (including nasalised finals)

Tone

Register

Assimilation
新婦房　ɬiŋ pu paŋ　→　ɬiŋ mu βaŋ

青草 tsʰɔŋ tsʰau　→　tsʰɔŋ nau

Comparison between Putian Min and Quanzhou Min Nan

Sentence-final particles
 ah: used to express exclamation.
 lah: used to stress or for adding emotional effect to your words.
 neh: used for questioning.
 nɔ: used to express emotion.
 yɔu: used to denote obviousness or contention.

Romanization

Hing-hua̍ báⁿ-uā-ci̍ is the Romanization system for Puxian Min. It has 23 letters: .

The Romanization only needs five tone marks for seven tones:

 陰平 Ing-báⁿ　(unmarked)
 陰上 Ing-siō̤ng　ˆ (â)
 陰去 Ing-kṳ̍　ˈ (a̍)
 陰入 Ing-ci̍h (unmarked)
 陽平 Ió̤ng-báⁿ　́ (á)
 陽去 Ió̤ng-kṳ̍　– (ā)
 陽入 Ió̤ng-ci̍h　ˈh (a̍h)

References

External links

 Motoki Makajima, Conversational Texts in Two Min Dialects, 1979
 Pu-Xian Min at Omniglot

 
Min Chinese
Languages of China
Languages of Taiwan
Languages of Malaysia
Languages of Singapore